was a Heian period waka poet and Japanese nobleman. He was the son of Sakanoue no Korenori, one of the Thirty-six Poetry Immortals.

As one of the Five Men of the Pear Chamber (梨壺の五人), he contributed to the compilation of the Gosen Wakashū. He also compiled kundoku (訓読) readings for texts from the Man'yōshū.

References

External links 
E-text of one of his poems in Japanese

Japanese poets
Year of death unknown
Year of birth unknown